The 38th British Academy Film Awards, which honoured the best films of 1984, were presented by the British Academy of Film and Television Arts at the Grosvenor House Hotel in London on 5 March 1985.

The evening's big winner was the British-made The Killing Fields, which had 13 nominations and won 8 of them.

Winners and nominees

BAFTA Outstanding British Contribution to Cinema Award: Alan Parker and Alan Marshall

Statistics

See also
 57th Academy Awards
 10th César Awards
 37th Directors Guild of America Awards
 42nd Golden Globe Awards
 5th Golden Raspberry Awards
 11th Saturn Awards
 37th Writers Guild of America Awards

References

Film038
British Academy Film Awards
British Academy Film Awards
British Academy Film Awards
British Academy Film Awards
1984 awards in the United Kingdom